Blackboards (Takhté siah) is a 2000 Iranian film directed by Samira Makhmalbaf. It focuses on a group of Kurdish refugees after the chemical bombing of Halabja  by Saddam Hussein's Iraq during the Iran–Iraq War. The screenplay was co-written by Makhmalbaf with her father, Mohsen Makhmalbaf. The dialogue is entirely in Kurdish. Makhmalbaf describes it as "something between reality and fiction. Smuggling, being homeless, and people’s efforts to survive are all part of reality... the film, as a whole, is a metaphor."

The film was an international co-production between the Makhmalbaf Productions of Iran, the Italian companies Fabrica and Rai Cinemafiction, and the Japanese company T-Mark.

Cast
 Said Mohamadi as 1.Teacher Saeed
 Behnaz Jafari as Halaleh
 Bahman Ghobadi as 2.Teacher Rebvar
 Mohamad Karim Rahmati	as Father
 Rafat Moradi as Pupil Rebvar

Awards
 "Jury Prize", Official Competition section of the 2000 Cannes Film Festival, France.
 "Federico Fellini Honor", UNESCO, Paris, 2000.
 "François Truffaut prize", Giffoni Film Festival in Italy 2000.
 "Giffoni's Mayor Prize", Giffoni Film Festival, Italy, 2000.
 "Special cultural Prize", UNESCO, Paris, 2000.
 "The Grand Jury prize", American Film Institute, USA, 2000

References

Further reading
 Rosenbaum reviews Blackboards and notes parallels with the 1950 Western, Wagon Master, that was conceived, produced, and directed by John Ford.

External links

Iranian drama films
1999 films
1999 drama films
Italian drama films
Japanese drama films
Kurdish-language films
Films directed by Samira Makhmalbaf
Films about educators
Films set in Iran
1990s Japanese films